Jolimont may refer to:

Jolimont, Victoria, a locality within East Melbourne
Jolimont railway station
Jolimont, Western Australia
Jolimont (mountain), in the Swiss Jura